Mahakal Institute of Technology Ground or MIT Ground  is a multi-purpose stadium in Ujjain, Madhya Pradesh. The ground is mainly used for organizing matches of football, cricket and other sports. The ground has floodlights so that the stadium can host day-night matches. It was made considering all norms of BCCI so that Ranji Trophy matches can be played. The stadium was established in 2013 when they hosted a match of MM Jagdale Under-15 Inter Divisional Tournament between Ujjain Under-15s and Bhopal Under-15s.

References

External links 

 Official Website
 cricketarchive
 Wikimapia

Malwa
Ujjain
Sports venues in Madhya Pradesh
Sports venues in Ujjain
Sport in Madhya Pradesh
Buildings and structures in Ujjain
Cricket grounds in Madhya Pradesh
Sports venues completed in 2013
2013 establishments in Madhya Pradesh
Sport in Ujjain
Football venues in Madhya Pradesh